Damon Thomas (December 15, 1970) is a former professional American football player born in Clovis, California.

College 
Thomas played college football starring for the Wayne State Wildcats in Nebraska. Thomas and teammates Brett Salisbury, 
Byron Chamberlain, and Brad Ottis all went on to play professionally.

Professional career

NFL
He also played 2 seasons in the NFL for the Buffalo Bills, where he caught three passes in two seasons.

Europe/France
Thomas played professionally in Europe, first for the Thonon Black Panthers of France 
in the Championnat Élite Division 1 league.

References

Living people
1970 births
Wayne State Wildcats football players
Buffalo Bills players
American expatriate sportspeople in France
Sportspeople from Clovis, California
American football wide receivers
American expatriate players of American football